Barelal Jatav is an Indian politician. He was elected to the Lok Sabha, lower house of the Parliament of India from Morena, Madhya Pradesh as a member of the Indian National Congress.

References

External links
 Official biographical sketch in Parliament of India website

Lok Sabha members from Madhya Pradesh
India MPs 1991–1996
Indian National Congress politicians
1953 births
Living people